Data Privacy Day (known in Europe as Data Protection Day) is an international event that occurs every year on 28 January. The purpose of Data Privacy Day is to raise awareness and promote privacy and data protection best practices. It is currently observed in the United States, Canada, Nigeria, Israel and 47 European countries.

Data Privacy Day's educational initiative originally focused on raising awareness among businesses as well as users about the importance of protecting the privacy of their personal information online, particularly in the context of social networking. The educational focus has expanded over the years to include families, consumers and businesses. In addition to its educational initiative, Data Privacy Day promotes events and activities that stimulate the development of technology tools that promote individual control over personally identifiable information; encourage compliance with privacy laws and regulations; and create dialogues among stakeholders interested in advancing data protection and privacy. The international celebration offers many opportunities for collaboration among governments, industry, academia, nonprofits, privacy professionals and educators.

The Convention for the Protection of Individuals with regard to Automatic Processing of Personal Data was opened for signature by the Council of Europe on 28 January 1981. This convention is currently in the process of being updated in order to reflect new legal challenges caused by technological development. The Convention on Cybercrime is also protecting the integrity of data systems and thus of privacy in cyberspace. Privacy including data protection is also protected by Article 8 of the European Convention on Human Rights.

The day was initiated by the Council of Europe to be first held in 2007 as the European Data Protection Day.
Two years later, on 26 January 2009, the United States House of Representatives passed House Resolution HR 31 by a vote of 402–0, declaring 28 January National Data Privacy Day. On 28 January 2009, the Senate passed Senate Resolution 25 also recognizing 28 January 2009 as National Data Privacy Day. The United States Senate also recognized Data Privacy Day in 2010 and 2011.

Participating organizations
A few of the participating organizations for the 28 January 2016 Data Privacy and Protection day include: Anti-Phishing Working Group, Carnegie Mellon University, Cyber Data-Risk Managers, EDUCAUSE, Georgetown University, Federal Trade Commission (FTC), Federal Communications Commission (FCC), Federal Bureau of Investigation (FBI), Identity Theft Council, the Privacy Commissioner of Canada, New York State Attorney General Office, the UK Information Commissioner, and Data Security Council of India.

See also 
 Information privacy

References

External links 
Stay Safe Online website Archived (28 January 2012). National Cyber Security Alliance
Convention 108 of data protection

Information privacy
International observances
January observances
Privacy